Ardglass railway station was the terminus of the Downpatrick, Killough and Ardglass Railway, which ran from Belfast  south to Newcastle, County Down in Northern Ireland.

History

Opened by the Downpatrick, Killough and Ardglass Railway, it became part of the Belfast and County Down Railway. The station closed to passengers in 1950, by which time it had been taken over by the Ulster Transport Authority.

The site today 

The site was extant but the station buildings mostly roofless and derelict in 2017.

References 

 
 
 

Disused railway stations in County Down
Railway stations opened in 1892
Railway stations closed in 1950
1892 establishments in Ireland
1950 disestablishments in Northern Ireland
Railway stations in Northern Ireland opened in the 19th century